Wibawa Mukti Stadium, or officially Stadion Wibawa Mukti, is a multi-purpose stadium located in Cikarang, Bekasi Regency, West Java, Indonesia. It is currently used mostly for football matches.

Sports event
The stadium was built to host the 2014 Porda Jabar XII in Bekasi Regency and used as a venue for the 2016 PON XIX (19th Indonesian National Sports Week). The stadium is one of the venue for  men's football of 2018 Asian Games. It is currently the homeground for the Persikasi Bekasi club.

The stadium can accommodate 28,778 people with all-seater configuration. This stadium also has excellent transportation access, one of which is close to the Cibatu toll gate on KM 34.7 of Jakarta–Cikampek Toll Road.

International matches hosted

Tournament results

2018 Asian Games Men's Football

Gallery

References

Sports venues in Indonesia
Football venues in Indonesia
Rugby union stadiums in Indonesia
Sports venues in West Java
Multi-purpose stadiums in West Java
Football venues in West Java
Athletics (track and field) venues in West Java
Buildings and structures in West Java
Sport in West Java
Venues of the 2018 Asian Games
Asian Games football venues
2014 establishments in Indonesia
Sports venues completed in 2014